Although the West Indies has limited resources in terms of developing a large-scale fishing industry, the value of fish and sea products as a source of food has long been recognized. All Caribbean territories therefore have fishing industries.

Most Caribbean fishermen ply their trade from small boats (4–11 meters). These small craft, often without protection from sun or rain, are forced to remain very close to shore, seldom going more than 16 kilometers offshore.

Methods 
Several methods for catching fish are used:
 Fillet (gill) nets
 Trawling
 Line fishing
 Seining
 Fish pots and reels.

The method of fishing depends on the type and size of the fish to be caught. Trawling is used to catch shrimp, carite, snapper and cavali. The main catches from seine and gill nets are king fish, shark and carite. Fish pot catches are red snappers and jacks. Fishing is a year-round activity in the Caribbean and it directly employs thousands of people.

Sales and marketing
A number of different methods of selling are used in the Caribbean. Most small-scale fishermen take some of the catch for their families and sell the rest at the beach. If there is a delay between catching the fish and eating it, then some form of processing has to take place. The three processing methods that are common in the Caribbean are:
 Salting: The fish is washed, gutted, salted, then dried in the sun, or in a special electrical drying unit. Among fish salted are salt are salmon, shark, grouper and carite.
 Smoking: The fish is washed, gutted. a little salt is added, then it is partly cooked over a smoking fire. Herrings and jacks are normally preserved by this method.
 Fresh fish: The fish is washed, and passed through a machine which coats it with a film of ice. It is then wrapped in foil.

References

Caribbean
Economy of the Caribbean